Qarha may refer to:

Qarha, Akkar District, a village in Lebanon, Akkar District
Qarha, Baalbek District, a village in Lebanon, Baalbek District